Feoffees' Lands is an album by Jacqui McShee's Pentangle. It was released on the GJS label in 2005.

Track listing
"Banks of the Nile" (Traditional) – 6:35
"Nothing Really Changes" (Gerry Conway, Spencer Cozens, Jacqui McShee) – 5:53
"Acrobat (It's Just a Circus)" (Conway, Cozens, McShee) – 5:37
"Now's the Time" (Conway, Cozens, McShee) – 4:20
"Hot Air - Hot Night" (Conway, Cozens, McShee) – 6:05
"No Sweet Sorrow" (Conway, Cozens, David Hughes, McShee) – 3:39
"Sovay" (Traditional) – 5:24
"Two Magicians" (Traditional) – 5:41
"You've Changed" (Carey, Fischer) – 4:49
"Broomfield Hill" (Traditional) – 7:52

Personnel
 Jacqui McShee - vocals
 Gerry Conway - drums
 Spencer Cozens - keyboards
 Alan Thomson - basses
 Gary Foote - saxophones, flute, clarinet
 Guests: Martin Barre (guitars), David Hughes (guitar, backing vocals),  Mark Tucker (backing vocals), John Giblin (basses, Ravi kora and Tibetan overtone singing), Miles Bould (percussion), Jacqui's daughter Leah (backing vocals), Nathan Bray (trumpet), Barnaby Dickinson (trombone).

References

External links
 Feoffees' Lands at discogs.

2005 albums
Pentangle (band) albums